Katharine Elsie Bain Gordon ( Hogg, born 12 June 1915) was a British author who wrote eight romance novels from 1978 to 2001. For her debut novel, "The Emerald Peacock", she won in 1978 the Authors' Club First Novel Award, and in 1979 the Romantic Novel of the Year Award of Special Merit by the Romantic Novelists' Association.

Life and career
Gordon was born in Aberdeen, Scotland on 12 June 1915 to Ceylon missionary Henry Robert William Hogg and Katharine Eliza Hogg (née Henry). She started writing when she was seven years old. She moved to India at the age of even, where she later spent much of her life. She married Donald, an English Royal Air Force pilot, in India. He left the RAF following World War II, and flew as an airline captain. Before becoming a professional writer, she worked as Secretary to E. A. Army Wardens in Nairobi, Kenya, from 1950 to 1951; as Immigration Officer at the Immigration Department in Nairobi from 1954 to 1957; and as Consular Clerk at British Embassy in Khartoum, Sudan, from 1964 to 1969.

In 1981 Gordon was dividing her time between residencies in Cyprus and Jersey.

Bibliography

Peacock Series
 The Emerald Peacock (1978). This book tells the story of Sher Khan and Bianca.
 Peacock in Flight (1979) 
 " In the Shadow of the Peacock (1980). This book tells the story of Muna, the Rose of Madore.
 The Peacock Ring (1981) aka The Peacock Rider. This book tells the story of Robert, the son of Muna.
 The Peacock Fan (1996)
 Peacock in Jeopardy (1984)

Single Novels
 Cheetah (1986)

Zeena Series
 The Palace Garden (2000)
 The Long Love'' (2001)

References and sources

1915 births
Possibly living people
Writers from Aberdeen
British romantic fiction writers
RoNA Award winners
20th-century British novelists
21st-century British novelists
20th-century British women writers
21st-century British women writers
Women romantic fiction writers
British women novelists